El Paso Street is located in downtown El Paso. El Paso Street leads to a vehicular and pedestrian bridge into Ciudad Juárez, México and is owned by the Texas Department of Transportation (TXDOT). The street is well known as a shopping area serving both Mexican and United States shoppers.

References 

Geography of El Paso, Texas
Transportation in El Paso, Texas